Ünyön Künga Zangpo (Tibetan: དབུས་སྨྱོན་ཀུན་དགའ་བཟང་པོ།; Wylie: dbus smyon kun dga' bzang po; 1458-1532) was a famous yogin of the Kagyu sect of Tibetan Buddhism. While Künga Zangpo is a personal name that he received at the time of his monastic ordination, the moniker Ünyön ("ü-nyön"), meaning "Madman from the Ü [region]," was a title he earned through his distinctive tantric asceticism.

The term "the three madmen" (སྨྱོན་པ་གསུམ།; smyon pa gsum) is sometimes used to refer to the Madman of Ü along with his two "madman" contemporaries: the Madman of Tsang, and Drukpa Kunley, "the Madman of the Drukpa [Kagyu].".

Further reading 

A hagiographic text describing the complete life of the Madman of Ü, composed by his disciples, has been translated into English.

The Treasury of Lives biography of Unyon Kunga Zangpo by David DiValerio

References 

Tibetan Buddhist spiritual teachers
1458 births
1532 deaths